Menifee (1996–2019) was an American Thoroughbred racehorse.

Menifee may also refer to:

 Menifee County, Kentucky
 Menifee, California
 Menifee, Arkansas

See also
Menefee, surname